No 263 Squadron was a Royal Air Force fighter squadron formed in Italy towards the end of the First World War. After being disbanded in 1919 it was reformed in 1939 flying mainly strike and heavy fighter aircraft until becoming No 1 Squadron in 1958.

History

First World War
The squadron was formed in Italy on 27 September 1918 from flights of the Royal Naval Air Service after that service's amalgamation with the Royal Flying Corps to form the RAF. It flew Sopwith Babies and Felixstowe F3s from Otranto reconnoitring for submarines escaping from the Adriatic Sea into the Mediterranean Sea. The squadron was disbanded on 16 May 1919.

Second World War
The squadron reformed as a fighter squadron at RAF Filton near Bristol on 2 October 1939, taking over some of 605 Squadron's biplane Gloster Gladiator Mk.Is. It became operational towards the end of the year and scrambled for the first time on 12 January 1940. Around this time the squadron received 22 Gloster Gladiator Mk.IIs to replace the Mk.Is

Gloster Gladiator and Norway

The Gladiator may have looked like a First World War aircraft but with twice the speed of most First World War fighters it had considerably better performance. However, as a fighter, it did not compare well with the type of enemy aircraft it might expect to meet in the Second World War, being only slightly faster than the Heinkel 111 bomber.

Germany invaded Norway on 9 April 1940 and 263 Squadron was soon instructed to prepare for a move. On 20 April, the aircraft were flown, via RAF Sealand, to Scapa Flow, Scotland where Fleet Air Arm pilots landed them on the aircraft carrier  and 18 Gladiators sailed for Norway. On 24 April, after two days sailing, the squadron flew its aircraft off the carrier to a landing strip on the frozen lake Lesjaskogsvatnet in Oppland in central southern Norway.

Unfortunately for the enterprise, the squadron was extremely short of ground staff and equipment and few of its Gladiators had been prepared for combat before the Luftwaffe struck with Heinkel 111s shortly after daybreak on 25 April. By the end of 26 April, although 263 Squadron had managed to destroy two Heinkels, all of its aircraft had been destroyed or rendered unserviceable and by the end of the month the squadron was ordered home.

The re-equipped squadron returned to the far north of Norway on 21 May, flying from Bardufoss airfield, near Narvik, reinforced by No 46 Squadron whose Hurricanes arrived a few days later, using an airstrip at Skånland. Due to unsuitable ground at Skånland, 46 Squadron moved so that both were operating from Bardufoss by 27 May.

The squadrons had been ordered to defend the fleet anchorage at Skånland and the military base at Harstad on the island of Hinnøya. Action was short but intense before the squadrons were instructed on 2 June to prepare for evacuation; 263 Squadron had flown 249 sorties and claimed 26 enemy aircraft destroyed. 263's ten surviving Gladiators were landed on HMS Glorious on 7 June. The aircraft carrier was sunk and with it the aircraft from four squadrons. 263 Squadron lost its CO, S/Ldr John W Donaldson, F/Lt Alvin T Williams and P.O. Sidney Robert McNamara along with seven other pilots. Among the pilots who fought with the squadron in Norway and died on Glorious, was F.O. Grant Ede, DFC, one of many Bermudians to serve in the RAF during the war and the first Bermudian to die in the war.

Westland Whirlwind

The Westland Whirlwind was the first cannon-armed fighter for the RAF, first flown in October 1938 and at the production stage by 1940. It was a twin engined heavy fighter (also able to function as a fighter bomber with  bombload). With four 20mm Hispano cannon in the nose, it was more powerful than an eight-gunned fighter like the Spitfire or Hurricane. It was fast, matching the current Spitfire's maximum speed, but performed best at low altitude and was used for convoy escort and against small targets in the English Channel and northern France. Only 114 were produced (compared with over 20,000 Spitfires).

No. 263 Squadron spent the next six months with 13 Group near Edinburgh. It assembled on 10 June 1940 at RAF Drem and after two weeks moved to RAF Grangemouth, where it spent three months before returning to Drem until November and then moving again south to be nearer its intended targets in northern France and the English Channel.

During its time in Scotland, it had to sort out the final problems with the Rolls-Royce Peregrine engines and Hispano cannon. To fill the gap the squadron was provided with Hawker Hurricanes which were flown in action a few times. Production of the Peregrine by Rolls-Royce was slow and it was November before the squadron was fully equipped. The squadron transferred to RAF Exeter, commencing Chameleon patrols against enemy E-boats stationed in the English Channel and Western Approaches. The E-boats would rescue German bomber crews who had "ditched" in the sea. Here, on 12 January 1941, a section patrolling near the Isles of Scilly located a Junkers Ju 88 and Pilot Officer (PO) Stein was credited with a probable kill.

As well as its fighter capability, the Whirlwind could operate as a fighter-bomber. In September 1941 S/Ldr Thomas Pugh, the squadron's 21-year-old commander, suggested that the bombing capability should be investigated, however the idea was initially rejected. Finally, in August 1942 the squadron moved to RAF Colerne in Wiltshire and bomb-racks were fitted to eight aircraft; initially two  bombs could be carried, and later this was increased to two  bombs.

No. 263 Squadron flew Whirlwinds until the end of 1943, with the three years operating the type being spent in the west of the country: two years in airfields around Wiltshire, Dorset and Gloucestershire, six months in south Wales, and six months in Devon and Cornwall. Apart from periods of training and "rest and recuperation," the squadron's operations involved: air-ground attacks on airfields, railways and roads in northern France; air-sea attacks on enemy shipping (E-boats and armed trawlers); sea convoy escort; and bomber escort.

Hawker Typhoon

Like the Whirlwind, the Hawker Typhoon 1B was a fighter bomber or strike fighter. Although only powered by a single engine, the Napier Sabre, it was more powerful (2,260 hp) than the two Peregrine (885 hp each) Whirlwind engines. As well as four cannon it could be armed with two (later four) 500 lb (227 kg) bombs or eight "60lb" rockets. Like the Whirlwind it performed at its best at lower altitudes.

In December 1943, 263 Squadron became non-operational while aircrew and ground staff became familiar with the new plane. By the end of the month flying on the Whirlwind had shrunk to 22 hours and over 309 hours had been flown on the Typhoon. After two weeks Armament Practice Camp at RAF Fairwood Common, the squadron became operational again on 1 February 1944 and attacked for the first time on 3 February when three divebombing operations took place.

Cap Arcona
On 3 May 1945, three ships, the Cap Arcona, the Thielbek and the Deutschland, were sunk as a result of four attacks by Hawker Typhoons of No. 83 Group RAF. After No. 184 Squadron RAF and No. 198 Squadron RAF it was 263 Squadron's, by then based in RAF Ahlhorn (Großenkneten) who were led by Squadron Leader Marten T. S. Rumbold.

Post-war
After disbandment on 28 August 1945, No. 616 Squadron RAF with the Gloster Meteor jet fighters was renumbered as 263 squadron at RAF Acklington. After Meteors, 263 Squadron moved onto Hawker Hunters in 1955. The unit arrived at Wattisham in October 1950, and transferred to RAF Stradishall in August 1957. It was disbanded there on 1 July 1958 and renumbered to become No. 1 Squadron RAF. It was reformed for the last time on 1 June 1959 to operate the Bristol Bloodhound surface-to-air missile at RAF Watton until disbanding on 30 June 1963.

Aircraft operated

Organisation

See also
List of Royal Air Force aircraft squadrons

References

Notes

Bibliography

 Crawford, Alex. Gloster Gladiator. Sandomierz, Poland/Redbourn, UK: Mushroom Model Publications, 2002. .
 Halley, James J. The Squadrons of the Royal Air Force & Commonwealth, 1918–1988. Tonbridge, Kent, UK: Air-Britain (Historians) Ltd., 1988. .
 Jefford, C G. RAF Squadrons, A Comprehensive Record of the Movement and Equipment of all RAF Squadrons and their Antecedents since 1912, first edition 1988, Airlife Publishing, UK, .
 Jefford, C.G. RAF Squadrons, A Comprehensive Record of the Movement and Equipment of all RAF Squadrons and their Antecedents since 1912. Shrewsbury, UK: Airlife Publishing, 1998 (Second edition 2001). .
 Rawlings, John D.R. Fighter Squadrons of the RAF and their Aircraft. London: Macdonald and Jane's (Publishers) Ltd., 1969 (new edition 1976, reprinted 1978). .

External links

 History of 263 Squadron at raf.mod.uk
 History of No.'s 261–265 Squadrons at RAF Web
 No. 263 Squadron in art – painting of a No. 263 Squadron Westland Whirlwind
 No. 263 Squadron Video - Video of No. 263 Squadron Operating the Westland Whirlwind in 1943.

Military units and formations established in 1918
263 Squadron
Military units and formations disestablished in 1959
1918 establishments in the United Kingdom